In enzymology, an indoxyl-UDPG glucosyltransferase is an enzyme that catalyzes the chemical reaction

UDP-glucose + indoxyl  UDP + indican

Thus, the two substrates of this enzyme are UDP-glucose and indoxyl, whereas its two products are UDP and indican.

This enzyme belongs to the family of glycosyltransferases, specifically the hexosyltransferases.  The systematic name of this enzyme class is UDP-glucose:indoxyl 3-O-beta-D-glucosyltransferase. This enzyme is also called indoxyl-UDPG-glucosyltransferase.

References

 

EC 2.4.1
Enzymes of unknown structure